In Eastern Orthodox and Eastern Catholic Christianity, the Joy of all who sorrow, or the Joy of all afflicted is a title given to the Theotokos (Mary, the mother of Jesus). The iconography is specifically Russian, without Byzantine precedent.

Background
It is also a type of icon that depicts the Theotokos in a specific manner, standing beneath her Son, who is in Heaven as a king, and surrounded by people and angels. In addition, specific hymns are dedicated to celebrating her role of bringing hope and salvation into the world, thus becoming joy for all who sorrow:

"To Thee, the champion leader, do we Thy servants dedicate a hymn of victory and thanksgiving, as ones who have been delivered from eternal death by the Grace of Christ our God Who was born of Thee and by Thy maternal mediation before Him. As Thou dost have invincible might, free us from all misfortunes and sorrowful circumstances who cry aloud:

Rejoice, O Virgin Theotokos, full of Grace, Joy of all who sorrow!". 

Many Orthodox parishes are named "Joy of all who Sorrow" and specific commemoration of the Joy of all who Sorrow is on July 23, on Orthodox calendars.

References

External links
 Joy of All Who Sorrow on OrthodoxWiki

Titles of Mary
Eastern Christian liturgy
Russian icons
Eastern Orthodox icons of the Virgin Mary
Virgin Mary in art